The 2017 Saskatchewan Roughriders season was the 60th season for the team in the Canadian Football League. It was the club's 108th year overall, and its 102nd season of play. The Roughriders improved upon their 5–13 record from 2016 and clinched a playoff spot with a win over the Calgary Stampeders on October 20, 2017. They finished in fourth place in the West Division and crossed over to the East Division playoffs for the third time in franchise history. They won their first ever East Semi-Final game by defeating the Ottawa Redblacks, but lost the following week to the Toronto Argonauts 25–21 in the last minute of the game.

This was the first season that the Roughriders were playing at their brand new stadium, Mosaic Stadium, following the previous 95 years at the site of Mosaic Stadium at Taylor Field. This was the second season under head coach and general manager Chris Jones. For the fifth consecutive season, the club held their training camp at Griffiths Stadium in Saskatoon with the main camp beginning on May 28.

Offseason

Player transactions
On November 15, 2016, Regina was announced as the host city for the inaugural CFL Week, which took place in March 2017. Regina was the only place besides Toronto to host the CFL's National Combine. On November 28, 2016, the Roughriders announced the signings of Bryan Bennett, Terrance Campbell, Kenny Horsley, and Thomas Mayo.

On December 1, 2016, Roughriders running back Joe McKnight was fatally shot in Terrytown, Louisiana in a road rage incident.

On December 6, 2016, Roughriders defensive end Eric Norwood announced his retirement. On December 7, 2016, defensive back Justin Cox signed an extension with the Roughriders. On December 19, 2016, Roughriders linebacker Marvin Golding was suspended two games for violating the CFL's drug policy. On January 3, 2017, the Roughriders announced the signings of Daniel Thomas, Jordan Reaves and Kelvin Muamba. On January 6, 2017, the Roughriders announced the extensions of kicker Tyler Crapigna and defensive back Ed Gainey through the 2019 season. On January 11, 2017, the Roughriders announced the extension of defensive lineman Jonathan Newsome through the 2018 season.

On January 13, 2017, the Roughriders traded the rights of quarterback Darian Durant to the Montreal Alouettes in exchange for a fourth round selection in the 2017 CFL Draft and a conditional second round selection in the 2018 CFL Draft. The Alouettes would then re-sign Durant to a three-year contract on January 19.

On January 14, 2017, the Roughriders released linebacker Jeff Knox, Jr. so he could sign a deal with the Tampa Bay Buccaneers of the National Football League. On January 20, 2017, the Roughriders announced the extension of defensive lineman Willie Jefferson. On January 23, 2017, the Roughriders announced the signing of quarterback Kevin Glenn, who was released by the Winnipeg Blue Bombers on January 6. This will be Glenn's third stint with the Roughriders.

On January 26, 2017, the Roughriders announced the signing of wide receiver Duron Carter. The following day, the Roughriders released Dylan Ainsworth, Shamawd Chambers, Mitchell Gale and Curtis Steele. Later in the day, the Roughriders signed defensive back Erick Dargan, and released defensive back Otha Foster so he could sign an NFL contract with the Baltimore Ravens.

On February 14, 2017, the Roughriders signed offensive lineman Derek Dennis. That same day, they signed Canadian running back Kienan LaFrance.

On February 15, 2017, the Roughriders signed Canadian safety Marc-Olivier Brouillette, running back Aaron Milton, offensive lineman Ryan White and 2012 CFL Most Outstanding player, international wide receiver Chad Owens. The next day, the Roughriders signed running back Cameron Marshall and released offensive lineman Andrew Jones.

On February 17, 2017, the Roughriders re-signed offensive lineman Thaddeus Coleman. On February 20, 2017, the Roughriders released linebacker Korey Jones.

CFL draft
The 2017 CFL Draft took place on May 7, 2017. The Roughriders had the 2nd overall selection after a 5-13 season in 2016. The Roughriders had nine selections, as they gained three picks and lost one pick in trades. The team also forfeited their 3rd round selection when taking safety Kevin Francis in the 2016 Supplemental Draft.

Preseason

Regular season

Standings

Schedule

Post-season

Schedule

Team

Roster

Coaching staff

References

Saskatchewan Roughriders seasons
2017 Canadian Football League season by team
2017 in Saskatchewan